Jianguomen may refer to:
 Jianguomen (Beijing), a gate of the city wall of Beijing, now demolished
 Things named after Jianguomen (Beijing):
 Jianguomen Bridge, a road bridge that stood at the former location of Jianguomen proper
 Jianguomen Subdistrict, an administrative subdivision and a neighbourhood of Beijing
 Jianguomen station, a mass transit railway station
 Jianguomen (Xi'an)

See also
 Jianguomen Inner Street, Beijing
 Jianguomen Outer Street, Beijing
 Tian Mingjian incident, also known as Jianguomen incident
 Jianguo Road (disambiguation)